Werner Weist (11 March 1949 – 13 May 2019) was a German footballer who played as a striker. He spent nine seasons in the Bundesliga with Borussia Dortmund and SV Werder Bremen. The best result he achieved was fifth place.

References

External links
 

1949 births
2019 deaths
Association football forwards
German footballers
Bundesliga players
Borussia Dortmund players
SV Werder Bremen players
Stuttgarter Kickers players
Footballers from Dortmund